NLR family CARD domain-containing protein 4 is a protein that in humans is encoded by the NLRC4 gene.

Structure 

The NLRC4 protein is highly conserved across mammalian species. It bears homology to the C. elegans Ced4 protein. It contains an N-terminal CARD domain, a central nucleotide binding/NACHT domain, and a C-terminal leucine rich repeat (LRR) domain. It belongs to a family of NLR proteins that includes the transcriptional co-activator CIITA and the canonical inflammasome protein NLRP3. A truncated murine NLRC4 was the first member of this family whose crystal structure was solved.

Function 

NLRC4 is best associated with triggering formation of the inflammasome. Unlike NLRP3, certain inflammasome-dependent functions of NLRC4 may be carried out independently of the inflammasome scaffold ASC.  Human Ced4 homologs include APAF1, NOD1 (CARD4), and NOD2 (CARD15). These proteins have at least 1 N-terminal CARD domain followed by a centrally located  nucleotide-binding domain (NBD or NACHT) and a C-terminal regulatory domain, found only in mammals, that contains either WD40 repeats or leucine-rich repeats (LRRs). CARD12 is a member of the Ced4 family and can induce apoptosis.

Interactions 

NLRC4 has been shown to interact with NAIP (there is one human NAIP but mice express at least 4 distinct NAIP proteins). The NAIP/NLRC4 interaction may determine the ligand specificity. NLRC4-dependent inflammasome activity activates CASP1. Under certain circumstances, NLRC4 and NLRP3 may occupy the same inflammasome complex.

Clinical significance 

Humans bearing activating mutations in NLRC4 can develop an autoinflammatory syndrome characterized by acute fever, hepatitis, very high serum ferritin, and other features suggestive of Macrophage Activation Syndrome (MAS). Some patients also developed a potentially life-threatening enterocolitis that abated during early childhood. In these patients, chronic and extraordinary elevation of serum IL-18 is found, in distinction from patients with NLRP3 mutations who develop Cryopyrin Associated Periodic Syndromes. A large Japanese family had much milder disease associated with cold-induced urticaria that was caused by a dominantly inherited NLRC4 mutation.

References

Further reading 

 
 
 
 
 
 
 
 
 

LRR proteins
NOD-like receptors